Brooklyn Unit School District  is a school district serving Brooklyn, Illinois in Greater St. Louis, United States.

As of 2012, the district has about 240 students. The district consists of two school buildings: the main Lovejoy School building, which houses the district administrative offices and facilities for grades 3 through 12, and the Amelia Cole Liddell Annex building, which houses Head Start/Pre-Kindergarten programs, Kindergarten, and Grades 1 and 2. The students are organized into three schools: Lovejoy Elementary in grades Kindergarten through 5, Lovejoy Middle School in grades 6 through 8, and Lovejoy Academy in grades 9 through 12.

References

External links

 

School districts in Illinois
Education in St. Clair County, Illinois